209th Detachment, 2325th Group, commonly known as Unit 684 (684부대), was a black operations unit of the Republic of Korea Air Force formed to assassinate North Korean leader Kim Il-sung in 1968, in retaliation for the Blue House raid. The unit consisted of 31 civilian recruits, mostly petty criminals and unemployed youths, and underwent three years of harsh training on the island of Silmido. The assassination mission was cancelled in 1971 and the unit mutinied, resulting in a firefight in Seoul in which most of the members of the unit were killed. The four survivors were sentenced to death by a military tribunal and executed.

Formation

The 209th Detachment, 2325th Group was founded on 1 April 1968 by the Korean Central Intelligence Agency (KCIA), the main intelligence agency of South Korea, on the orders of President Park Chung-hee. According to the Ministry of National Defence the unit, nicknamed Unit 684 after its founding date, was officially a detachment of the Republic of Korea Air Force’s 2325th Group, which recruited 31 civilians, either petty criminals or unemployed youths who were promised money and jobs if they succeeded in their mission.

Unit 684 was formed to retaliate for the Blue House raid, a failed attempt by North Korea's Unit 124 to assassinate Park, which had occurred two months earlier in late January. Unit 124 was a black operations unit of the North Korean Special Operation Force created specifically to assassinate Park in an operation to enter secretly across the Demilitarized Zone and kill him at the Blue House in Seoul to trigger political turmoil. However, Unit 124 were detected by the police only 100 metres from the Blue House wearing Republic of Korea Army uniforms, and 29 of 31 commandos were killed within a week. Park decided to mirror Unit 124's mission by forming an elite black operations unit of 31 men to assassinate Kim Il-sung, the leader of North Korea. 

Unit 684's members were trained on Silmido, a small uninhabited island off the coast of Incheon in the Yellow Sea. Members of Unit 684 endured three years of exceptionally harsh training, during which seven members died.

Mutiny

Unit 684's assassination mission was cancelled in August 1971 following an improvement in relations between North Korea and South Korea.

On 23 August 1971, the 24 surviving members of Unit 684 mutinied, killed all but six of their guards, and made their way to the mainland, where they hijacked a bus to Seoul. The bus was stopped by the army in the Daebang-dong neighborhood of Dongjak District, Seoul. Twenty members of the unit were shot or committed suicide with hand grenades.

A contemporary news report in The New York Times stated that 23 members of the unit, described by the Defense Minister Chung Rae-hyuk as "special criminals," had killed 12 Air Force guards on Silmido, escaped the island dressed as paratroopers, landed on a beach near Inchon around 1pm and then hijacked a bus. Hundreds of soldiers and police were mobilized to intercept the bus forcing it to crash into a tree in southwestern Seoul. After a standoff the unit members detonated hand grenades on the bus killing 15 and leaving four wounded. The "invasion" of Seoul had resulted in 34 killed, 30 wounded and seven missing. The Defense Minister declined to explain why non-military personnel had been kept in military custody. 

Six guards survived the Silmido uprising. One of the guards, Yang Dong-su, confirmed that the unit's mission had been to infiltrate North Korea and kill Kim Il-sung. Yang stated that most of the unit's members were petty criminals, stating that "They were the kind who would get into street fights a lot." Yang also gives his version of why the uprising occurred: "They revolted because they felt that they were never going to get the chance to go to North Korea and that they would never be allowed to leave the island. They were in despair."

Aftermath
The four survivors of Unit 684 were sentenced to death by a military tribunal and executed on March 10, 1972. The South Korean government concealed all information regarding Unit 684 until the 1990s.

Unit 684 came to public attention with the release of the film Silmido in 2003, but the government only released an official report on the unit and the mutiny in 2006.

In 2009, the families of 21 members of Unit 684 sued the South Korean government for ₩670 million in compensation. On May 19, 2010, the Seoul Central District Court ordered that the government pay ₩273 million in compensation to the families. The court found that "the Silmido agents were not informed of the level of danger involved with their training, and the harshness of the training violated their basic human rights" and also acknowledged the emotional pain the government caused by not officially disclosing the deaths of the agents to family members until 2006.

References

Sources
The Korea Times: Military Admits 'Silmido Unit' for First Time
NKIDP: Crisis and Confrontation on the Korean Peninsula: 1968–1969, A Critical Oral History

Military history of South Korea
Military scandals
Air force special forces units
Failed assassination attempts in Asia
Special forces of the Republic of Korea
Scandals in South Korea
1968 establishments in South Korea
Military units and formations established in 1968
Conflicts in 1971
1971 in South Korea